The Indian Regional Navigation Satellite System (IRNSS), with an operational name of NavIC (acronym for 'Navigation with Indian Constellation; also,  'sailor' or 'navigator' in Indian languages), is an autonomous regional satellite navigation system that provides accurate real-time positioning and timing services. It covers India and a region extending  around it, with plans for further extension. An extended service area lies between the primary service area and a rectangle area enclosed by the 30th parallel south to the 50th parallel north and the 30th meridian east to the 130th meridian east,  beyond borders where some of the NavIC satellites are visible but the position is not always computable with assured accuracy. The system currently consists of a constellation of eight satellites, with two additional satellites on ground as stand-by.

The constellation is in orbit as of 2018. NavIC will provide two levels of service, the "standard positioning service", which will be open for civilian use, and a "restricted service" (an encrypted one) for authorised users (including the military).

NavIC-based trackers are compulsory on commercial vehicles in India and some consumer mobile phones with support for it have been available since the first half of 2020.

There are plans to expand the NavIC system by increasing its constellation size from 7 to 11.

Background 
The system was developed partly because access to foreign government-controlled global navigation satellite systems is not guaranteed in hostile situations, as happened to the Indian military in 1999 when the United States denied an Indian request for Global Positioning System (GPS) data for the Kargil region, which would have provided vital information. The Indian government approved the project in May 2006.

As per National Defense Authorization Act 2020, United States Secretary of Defense in consultation with Director of National Intelligence will designate NavIC, Galileo and QZSS as allied navigational satellite system.

Development 
As part of the project, the Indian Space Research Organisation (ISRO) opened a new satellite navigation centre within the campus of ISRO Deep Space Network (DSN) at Byalalu, in Karnataka on 28 May 2013. A network of 21 ranging stations located across the country will provide data for the orbital determination of the satellites and monitoring of the navigation signal.

A goal of complete Indian control has been stated, with the space segment, ground segment and user receivers all being built in India. Its location in low latitudes facilitates coverage with low-inclination satellites. Three satellites will be in geostationary orbit over the Indian Ocean. Missile targeting could be an important military application for the constellation.

The NavIC Signal in Space ICD was released for evaluation in September 2014.

From 1 April 2019, use of AIS 140 compliant NavIC-based vehicle tracking systems were made compulsory for all commercial vehicles in India.

In 2020, Qualcomm launched four Snapdragon 4G chipsets and one 5G chipset with support for NavIC. NavIC is planned to be available for civilian use in mobile devices, after Qualcomm and ISRO signed an agreement. To increase compatibility with existing hardware, ISRO will add L1 band support. For strategic application, Long Code support is also coming.

Time-frame 
In April 2010, it was reported that India plans to start launching satellites by the end of 2011, at a rate of one satellite every six months. This would have made NavIC functional by 2015. But the program was delayed, and India also launched 3 new satellites to supplement this.

Seven satellites with the prefix "IRNSS-1" will constitute the space segment of the IRNSS. IRNSS-1A, the first of the seven satellites, was launched on 1 July 2013. IRNSS-1B was launched on 4 April 2014 on-board PSLV-C24 rocket. The satellite has been placed in geosynchronous orbit. IRNSS-1C was launched on 16 October 2014, IRNSS-1D on 28 March 2015, IRNSS-1E on 20 January 2016, IRNSS-1F on 10 March 2016 and IRNSS-1G was launched on 28 April 2016.

The eighth satellite, IRNSS-1H, which was meant to replace IRNSS-1A, failed to deploy on 31 August 2017 as the heat shields failed to separate from the 4th stage of the rocket. IRNSS-1I was launched on 12 April 2018 to replace it.

System description 
The IRNSS system comprises a space segment and a support ground segment.

Space segment 
The constellation consists of 7 satellites. The remaining four satellites are in inclined geosynchronous orbit (GSO). Two of them cross the equator at 55° E and two at 111.75° E.

Ground segment 
The ground segment is responsible for the maintenance and operation of the IRNSS constellation. The ground segment comprises:
 IRNSS Spacecraft Control Facility (IRSCF)
 ISRO Navigation Centre (INC)
 IRNSS Range and Integrity Monitoring Stations (IRIMS)
 IRNSS Network Timing Centre (IRNWT)
 IRNSS CDMA Ranging Stations (IRCDR)
 Laser Ranging Stations
 IRNSS Data Communication Network (IRDCN)

The IRSCF is operational at Master Control Facility (MCF), Hassan and Bhopal. The MCF uplinks navigation data and is used for tracking, telemetry and command functions. Seven  FCA and two  FMA of IRSCF are currently operational for LEOP and on-orbit phases of IRNSS satellites.

The INC established at Byalalu performs remote operations and data collection with all the ground stations. The ISRO Navigation Centers (INC) are operational at Byalalu, Bengaluru and Lucknow. INC1 (Byalalu) and INC2 (Lucknow) together provide seamless operations with redundancy.

16 IRIMS are currently operational and are supporting IRNSS operations few more are planned in Brunei, Indonesia, Australia, Russia, France and Japan. CDMA ranging is being carried out by the four IRCDR stations on regular basis for all the IRNSS satellites. Laser ranging is being carried out with the support of ILRS stations around the world. Navigation software is operational at INC since 1 Aug 2013. All the navigation parameters, such as satellite ephemeris, clock corrections, integrity parameters, and secondary parameters, such as iono-delay corrections, time offsets with respect to UTC and other GNSSes, almanac, text message, and earth orientation parameters, are generated and uploaded to the spacecraft automatically. The IRDCN has established terrestrial and VSAT links between the ground stations. As of March 2021, ISRO and JAXA are performing calibration and validation experiments for NavIC ground reference station in Japan. ISRO is also under discussion with CNES for a NavIC ground reference station in France. ISRO is planning a NavIC ground station at Cocos (Keeling) Islands and is in talks with the Australian Space Agency.

Signal 
NavIC signals will consist of a Standard Positioning Service and a Restricted Service. Both will be carried on L5 (1176.45 MHz) and S band (2492.028 MHz). The SPS signal will be modulated by a 1 MHz BPSK signal. The Restricted Service will use BOC(5,2). The navigation signals themselves would be transmitted in the L5 (1176.45 MHz) & S band (2492.028 MHz) frequencies and broadcast through a phased array antenna to maintain required coverage and signal strength.

A messaging interface is embedded in the NavIC system. This feature allows the command center to send warnings to a specific geographic area. For example, fishermen using the system can be warned about a cyclone.

Accuracy 
GPS, for comparison, has a position accuracy of 5 m under ideal conditions. However, unlike GPS, which is dependent only on L-band, NavIC has dual frequencies (S and L bands). When a low-frequency signal travels through atmosphere, its velocity changes due to atmospheric disturbances. GPS depends on an atmospheric model to assess frequency error, and it has to update this model from time to time to assess the exact error. In NavIC, the actual delay is assessed by measuring the difference in delay of the two frequencies (S and L bands). Therefore, NavIC is not dependent on any model to find the frequency error and can be more accurate than GPS.

List of satellites
The constellation consists of 7 active satellites. Three of the seven satellites in constellation are located in geostationary orbit (GEO) and four are in inclined geosynchronous orbit (IGSO). All satellites launched or proposed for the system are as follows:

IRNSS series satellites

NVS series satellite

Clock failure 
In 2017, it was announced that all three SpectraTime supplied rubidium atomic clocks on board IRNSS-1A had failed, mirroring similar failures in the European Union's Galileo constellation. The first failure occurred in July 2016, followed soon after by the two other clocks on IRNSS-1A. This rendered the satellite non-functional and required replacement. ISRO reported it had replaced the atomic clocks in the two standby satellites, IRNSS-1H and IRNSS-1I in June 2017. The subsequent launch of IRNSS-1H, as a replacement for IRNSS-1A, was unsuccessful when PSLV-C39 mission failed on 31 August 2017. The second standby satellite, IRNSS-1I, was successfully placed into orbit on 12 April 2018.

In July 2017, it was reported that two more clocks in the navigational system had also started showing signs of abnormality, thereby taking the total number of failed clocks to five, in May 2018 a failure of a further 4 clocks was reported, taking the count to 9 of the 24 in orbit.

As a precaution to extend the operational life of navigation satellite, ISRO is running only one rubidium atomic clock instead of two in the remaining satellites.

Indigenous Atomic clock
In order to reduce the dependency on imported frequency standards  ISRO's Space Applications Centre (SAC), Ahmedabad had been working on indigenously designed and developed Rubidium based atomic clocks. To overcome the clock failures on first generation navigation satellites and its subsequent impact on NavIC's position, navigation, and timing services, these new clocks would supplement the imported atomic clocks in next generation of navigation satellites.

On 5 July 2017, ISRO and Israel Space Agency (ISA) signed an Memorandum of Understanding to collaborate on space qualifying a Rubidium Standard based on AccuBeat model AR133A and to test it on an ISRO satellite.

Future developments
India's Department of Space in their 12th Five Year Plan (FYP) (2012–17) stated increasing the number of satellites in the constellation from 7 to 11 to extend coverage. These additional four satellites will be made during 12th FYP and will be launched in the beginning of 13th FYP in geosynchronous orbit of 42° inclination. Also, the development of space-qualified Indian made atomic clocks was initiated, along with a study and development initiative for an all optical atomic clock (ultra stable for IRNSS and deep space communication).

ISRO will be launching five next generation satellite featuring new payloads and extended lifespan of 12 years. Five new satellites viz. NVS-01, NVS-02, NVS-03, NVS-04 and NVS-05 will supplement and augment the current constellation of satellites. The new satellites will feature the L5 and S band and introduces a new interoperable civil signal in the L1 band in the navigation payload and will use Indian Rubidium Atomic Frequency Standard (iRAFS) along . This introduction of the new L1 band will help facilitate NavIC proliferation in wearable smart and IoT devices featuring a low power navigation system. NVS-01 is a replacement for IRNSS-1G satellite and will launch on GSLV in 2023.

Global Indian Navigation System 
Study and analysis for the Global Indian Navigation System (GINS) was initiated as part of the technology and policy initiatives in the 12th FYP (2012–17). , the statutory filing for frequency spectrum of GINS satellite orbits in international space, has been completed. As per new 2021 draft policy, ISRO and Department of Space (DoS) is working on expanding the coverage of NavIC from regional to global that will be independent of other such system currently operational namely GPS, GLONASS, BeiDou and Galileo while remain interoperable and free for global public use. ISRO has proposed to Government of India to  expand the constellation for global coverage by initially placing twelve satellites in Medium Earth Orbit (MEO).

See also 
 GPS Aided GEO Augmented Navigation
 Quasi-Zenith Satellite System

References

Footnotes
  SATNAV Industry Meet 2006. ISRO Space India Newsletter. April – September 2006 Issue.

External links 
 IRNNS programme 

 
ISRO programs
Navigation satellite constellations
2013 establishments in India